Llangynog is a village and community at the confluence of the Afon Eirth and the Afon Tanat at the foot of the Berwyn range in north Powys (previously Montgomeryshire), Wales.
 
It lies at the foot of the Milltir Cerrig mountain pass on the B4391 road, which runs between Llan Ffestiniog and Llanfyllin (though the B4391 road number 'disappears' between the western end of Llyn Celyn and Bala).

It is surrounded by mountains including Craig Rhiwarth and is a popular base for walkers. Llangynog has a down-hill mountain bike course, and a crown green bowling club, who play in the Oswestry League.

It was the western terminus of the Tanat Valley Light Railway (Llynclys - Llangynog) (15 miles); it opened on 5 January 1904 and closed (passenger traffic) in 1951.

It is close to the pilgrimage shrine of Saint Melangell at the church of Pennant Melangell.

The community of Pen-y-Bont-Fawr neighbours the community of Llangynog and has a population of 440 as of the 2011 UK Census.

It falls under the Llanwddyn electoral ward for elections to Powys County Council.

Demographics
Llangynog's population was 339, according to the 2011 census; a 5.60% increase since the 321 people noted in 2001.

The 2011 census showed 36.7% of the population could speak Welsh, a fall from 50.6% in 2001, reportedly due to an influx of residents from the West Midlands.

See also 
Cambrian Railways

References

External links 
Photos of Llangynog and surrounding area on geograph
The Legend of Pererindod Melangell  - BBC Wales

Communities in Powys
Villages in Powys